The Mozart Medal is a name, after Wolfgang Amadeus Mozart, for various awards:

 Mozart Medal (Frankfurt) (Mozart Medaille), awarded by the city of Frankfurt
 Mozart Medal (Mexico), administered at times by the Austrian embassy in Mexico, the Domecq Cultural Institute, and the Academia Medalla Mozart
 Mozart Medal (Mozarteum) by the Mozarteum International Foundation
 Mozart Medal (Mozartgemeinde), awarded by the Mozartgemeinde Wien (Vienna Mozart Society)
 UNESCO Mozart Medal, awarded by UNESCO